Bayview is a suburb in Sydney's Northern Beaches region, in the state of New South Wales, Australia 31 kilometres north of the Sydney central business district, in the local government area of Northern Beaches Council.

Bayview is a hilly suburb, bounded by Pittwater to the north; Mona Vale to the east and south; and Church Point, Kuringai Chase and Ingleside to the west.

History 
Bayview takes its name from a description of its location, providing a "view" across "Pittwater". Governor Arthur Phillip took a short journey of exploration from Manly to this area in March 1788 and named it Pitt Water after William Pitt the Younger, the Prime Minister of the United Kingdom at the time. Captain John Hunter prepared a map showing the bays and inlets in 1792.

One of the first settlers was Patrick Bryan, who built a house in 1821 on the current site of the Bayview Golf Links.

A number of tetrahedron tank traps can be found off Pittwater Road on the water side in Bayview. These tank traps are a little-known remnant of WWII defence along Sydney's Northern Beaches.

Demographics
The most common responses for religious affiliation were No Religion 31.2%, Anglican 24.2% and Catholic 20.2%.

Of the occupied private dwellings in Bayview. 58.5% were separate houses, 28.6% were semi-detached and 12.7% were flats or apartments.

Schools
 St Luke's Grammar School (formerly Loquat Valley Anglican Preparatory School) –  Anglican Co-educational day school for children from Pre-Kindergarten to Year 6

Commercial and marinas
Bayview is primarily a residential area with limited commercial space.

Bayview is home to Australia's largest yacht importer, and largest yacht share fleet and Pittwater's largest yacht charter fleet.

There are currently two privately owned floating marinas (Gibson Marina and Bayview Anchorage Marina) with attached yacht selling/renting companies and NSW Maritime offices. On the marinas there are a few kiosks and restaurants.

Between the marinas is Bayview Yacht Racing Association (BYRA), used commonly by local school students for their popular learn-to-sail programs.

Parks
Bayview is a pet friendly neighbourhood and is home to a number of parks among the most loved in the Northern Beaches:
 Bayview Baths (which features a Swimming Enclosure)
 Bayview Park
 Bimbimbie Place Reserve
 Ilya Avenue Reserve
 Kamilaroi Park
 Kennedy Park
 Minkara Reserve
 Pindari Park
 Riddle Reserve
 Rowland Reserve

The most well-known being Roland Reserve, an open field dog park.

The importance of parks within the Bayview is the preservation of Spotted Gum Forests considered to be of nature conservation significance at State level and provides habitat for the threatened Glossy Black-cockatoo as well as provides habitat for birds, frogs, mammals, reptiles and acts as a stepping stone between larger areas of habitat due to its diversity.

Boat ramps
Bayview boasts the following boat launching:
 Rowland Reserve  two concrete ramps 14.4m x 20m.
 Bayview Park one concrete ramp 10.8m x 4m.
 Riddle Reserve  one concrete ramp 3m x 10m near dinghy storage and one concrete ramp 3m x 11m beside BYRA Yacht Club.
 Maybanke Cove one concrete ramp 3m x 10m near dinghy storage.

Golf clubs
Bayview is home to the Bayview Golf Course, an 18-hole course with a clubhouse in Mona Vale.

References 

Suburbs of Sydney
Northern Beaches Council